Desert Collectors is an Australian reality television series which premiered on A&E on 12 March 2017.

The series is set in Western Australia which is mostly desert and sparsely populated. The area is one of the largest gold and nickel mining areas in the world and is home to many unique and eccentric people. It follows Nigel Quick as he travels through the spectacular outback scenery steeped in history and heritage in search of unique treasures and meet the people who spend their lives collecting them.

Desert Collectors Season 1 had its free-to-air premiere on channel 7mate on 9 March 2019. Season 2 debuted on 7mate on 5 May 2020.

See also
 Aussie Pickers

References

A&E (Australian TV channel) original programming
2017 Australian television series debuts
2010s Australian reality television series
2020s Australian reality television series
Antiques television series
English-language television shows
Television shows filmed in Australia